The Austin K5 was a British heavy military truck built by Austin for use during the Second World War.

The K5 was used with open body and cab for carrying the Ordnance QF 6 pounder anti-tank gun portee in the North African Campaign or with an enclosed cab for General Service (GS). Enclosed body versions were used for salvage and rescue work in the UK.

It was nicknamed the "Screamer" because of a rather noisy transfer case.

References

External links 

 http://www.armyvehicles.dk/austink5.htm

Military trucks of the United Kingdom
Off-road vehicles
World War II vehicles of the United Kingdom
Soft-skinned vehicles
K5
Military vehicles introduced from 1940 to 1944